C-C chemokine receptor type 11 is a protein that in humans is encoded by the CCRL1 gene.

The protein encoded by this gene is a member of the G protein-coupled receptor family, and is a receptor for C-C type chemokines. This receptor has been shown to bind dendritic cell- and T cell-activated chemokines including CCL19/ELC, CCL21/SLC, and CCL25/TECK. Alternatively spliced transcript variants encoding the same protein have been described.

References

Further reading

External links
 
 

Chemokine receptors